Artyom Yevgenyevich Sokolov (born 1 April 2003) is a Russian football player. He plays as an attacking midfielder for FC Pari Nizhny Novgorod on loan from PFC Krylia Sovetov Samara.

Club career
He made his debut in the Russian Professional Football League for FC Chertanovo-2 Moscow on 11 May 2019 in a game against FC Znamya Truda Orekhovo-Zuyevo.

He made his Russian Football National League debut for FC Chertanovo Moscow on 17 November 2019 in a game against FC Khimki.

On 26 June 2021, he signed with Russian Premier League club FC Khimki. He made his RPL debut for Khimki on 1 August 2021 in a game against FC Krasnodar, he substituted Ilya Kukharchuk in the added time.

On 5 February 2022, Sokolov moved to Krylia Sovetov Samara. In February 2023, Sokolov was loaned to FC Pari Nizhny Novgorod.

Career statistics

References

External links
 
 
 Profile by Russian Football National League
 

2003 births
People from Yakutsk
Sportspeople from Sakha
Living people
Russian footballers
Russia youth international footballers
Russia under-21 international footballers
Association football midfielders
FC Chertanovo Moscow players
FC Khimki players
PFC Krylia Sovetov Samara players
FC Nizhny Novgorod (2015) players
Russian Premier League players
Russian First League players
Russian Second League players